D96  may refer to:
 HMS Gloucester (D96)
 HMS Crossbow (D96)
 Riverside School District 96